Relations between Armenia and France have existed since the French and the Armenians established contact in the Armenian Kingdom of Cilicia in the 12th century. Formal diplomatic relations between Armenia and France were established on 24 February 1992. Relations are regarded as excellent, with both countries cooperating on the aspects of diplomacy, culture and military. Due to good relations between the two countries, 2006 was proclaimed the Year of Armenia in France.

History

During the Middle Ages 

Prior to the 11th century, the Franks and the Armenians had limited contact due to the physical distance between the two nations.  However, there were earlier contacts between Armenians and Franks by way of the Roman Empire.  In 554 during the Battle of Casilinum the Armenian general Narses of the Eastern Roman Empire drove out the Franks and their allies the Alemanni from the Italian peninsula.

Towards the 11th century, the Armenians established the Principality and then Kingdom of Cilicia, which was located on the Mediterranean coast and thus accessible to the Franks and other Europeans who were participating in the Crusades. Armenia was the last Christian safe haven for the Crusaders before facing the Islamic armies of Syria and Palestine.  Unlike the Turkic arrival into the area, the Frankish arrival was interpreted positively by Armenian writers and other intellectuals.

In the twelfth and thirteenth centuries, continuous contact with Western Europe, most notably with the Frankish Kingdom made way for major social, cultural, and political change in Cilician Armenia. Armenians, who have their own branch of Christianity, came in contact with (and were influenced by) Catholic ideals.

The last dynasty (the Lusignans) to rule Cilician Armenia was of Frankish origin. The last king, Leo VI of Armenia, was buried in Saint Denis Basilica alongside notable French kings such as Charles Martel, Louis XIV, and many others. He was in fact the only foreigner who was buried there.

Contact within the Ottoman Empire 

During the reign of Louis XIV, a large number of Armenian manuscripts were taken into the National Library of France. Armenia and Armenian characters are often featured in classical French literature. Authors such as Montesquieu, Voltaire, Rousseau, and many others often talked about the contact of their main characters with Armenian secondary characters.

Armenian studies would start to develop in France after the creation of the Armenian department of the School of Oriental languages with the initiative of Napoleon I.

Modern diplomatic relations
Diplomatic relations between Armenia and France were established on 24 February 1992.
On 2 October 2009, Vigen Chitechian was appointed Ambassador Extraordinary and Plenipotentiary of Armenia to France. On 5 November 2010, Henri Reynaud, Ambassador Extraordinary and Plenipotentiary of the French Republic to Armenia, presented his credentials to the President of Armenia, Serzh Sargsyan. Also on 1 December 2011 Vardan Sirmakes was appointed Consul General of Armenia in Marseille.

On January 7, 2015, Minister of Foreign Affairs of Armenia Eduard Nalbandyan issued a press release on the Charlie Hebdo shooting, saying, "We strongly condemn terrorist act committed at the office of 'Charlie Hebdo' magazine in Paris" and added that "such appalling actions of extremists has no justification whatsoever and once again prove the necessity of wider solidarity in the international community's fight against terrorism." The Armenian Government also expressed their "condolences and support to the people, authorities of friendly France, editorial staff of 'Charlie Hebdo' magazine, and the relatives of the victims."

Though it has a very small French-speaking population, as a result of its historical ties to France, Armenia was selected to host the biennial Francophonie summit in 2018. French is taught at the Fondation Université Française en Arménie in Yerevan.

Armenian genocide

Towards the beginning of the 20th century, the pro-Armenian French would start to defend the Armenians’ rights whenever they were least respected. During 1915, the French welcomed tens of thousands of Armenians into their country which was a safe haven for them. France was also one of the few countries to send rescue boats for the Armenians. After a heroic 53-day battle of self-defence, the population of Musa Dagh was rescued by the French.  The population would eventually settle in Lebanon, mainly in the town of Anjar. 

In 1998, a resolution by the French National Assembly, saying “France recognizes the Armenian genocide of 1915." was passed which came with strong Turkish objection.

France was also the first European country to officially recognize the Armenian genocide (2001).

In 2006, tensions mounted between France and Turkey after the French National Assembly voted in favor of a bill which makes Armenian Genocide denial illegal.

Armenians in France 

The Armenians of France, now numbering between 250,000 and 750,000, remained close to their cultural origins, while at the same time; they integrated in France and contributed greatly to Francophone culture.

Many Armenian writers, painters and musicians, such as Sarian, Kochar, Issahakian, Komitas, and many others have worked and have died in France. Both French and Armenians are proud of the likes of Charles Aznavour  and Henri Verneuil.

Resident diplomatic missions
 Armenia has an embassy in Paris and consulates-general in Lyon and Marseille.
 France has an embassy in Yerevan.

Country comparison

See also  
 Armenia–European Union relations
 Armenians in Europe 
 Armenians in France
 Foreign relations of Armenia
 Foreign relations of France 
 Frenchs in Armenia
 Armenian genocide recognition

Notes and references 

 
France
Bilateral relations of France